Ringkjøbing can refer to:
 Ringkjøbing County
 Ringkøbing, its capital